Oued Amlil is a town in Taza Province, Fès-Meknès, Morocco. According to the 2016 census it has a population of 20,000.

Amlil is an amazigh (berber) word for "white", while oued is Arabic for "river". The native amazigh name is Asif Amlil, asif meaning “river” in amazigh language.

References

Populated places in Taza Province